{{Infobox person
| name            = Ayumi Beppu
| image           = replace this image female.svg
| caption         = Ayumi Beppu as Houka Ozu/MagiPink in Mahou Sentai Magiranger
| birth_name      = 
| birth_date      = 
| birth_place     = Sakai, Osaka, Japan
| height = 165 cm
| death_date      = 
| death_place     = 
| alias           = 
| homepage        = 
| years_active     = 2002-present
}}

 is a Japanese actress and tarento from Sakai, Osaka Prefecture.

FilmographyMahou Sentai Magiranger - Houka Ozu/Magi Pink (2005)Mahou Sentai Magiranger The Movie: Bride of Infershia - Houka Ozu/Magi Pink (2005)Mahou Sentai Magiranger vs. Dekaranger - Houka Ozu/Magi Pink (2006)Cho Ninja Tai Inazuma! - Woman Space Sheriff Beppy (2006)Cho Ninja Tai Inazuma!! SPARK - Hayabusa, Beppy/Ayumiko Kitabeppu (2007)Kaizoku Sentai Gokaiger - Houka Ozu/Magi Pink (2012)
 Rurouni Kenshin: Kyoto Inferno - Omime (2014)
 Rurouni Kenshin: The Legend Ends - Omime (2014)
 Hero Mama League'' - Houka Ozu/Magi Pink (2018)

External links
Ayumi Beppu at Office Asobo
Ayumi Beppu's New Personal Blog
Ayumi Beppu's Personal Blog

Japanese actresses
Japanese television personalities
1983 births
Living people
People from Sakai, Osaka